Paula Fudge (née Yeoman; born 30 March 1952) is an English former middle and long-distance runner. She won a gold medal in the 3000 metres at the 1978 Commonwealth Games, and on 13 September 1981 she set the world record for the 5000 metres with 15.14.51, the first recognised women's 5000m world record by the IAAF. This record remained the British record until 1985 when it was broken by Zola Budd. She also won a bronze medal in the 3000 metres at the 1982 European Indoor Championships.

Fudge made her marathon debut at the 1985 Columbus Marathon, winning in a time of 2:35:10. She then won a team gold medal at the 1985 World 15km Road Race Championships, and finished fifth individually. She improved her marathon personal best to 2:32:25 at the 1986 London Marathon. After the withdrawals of her twin sister Ann Ford and Priscilla Welch due to injury, and Veronique Marot declining selection, Fudge was selected to compete in the marathon at the 1988 Seoul Olympics, but she too turned the offer down. A month after the Olympics, she ran her best-ever marathon time, when finishing third at the Chicago Marathon in 2:29:47.

In 2003, Fudge broke the UK W50 record by running 79:39 at the Fleet Half Marathon. A record that stood until 2011. She became an athletics coach at her running club Windsor, Slough, Eton and Hounslow Athletic Club

International competitions

References

External links
 ARRS
 gbrathletics
 Paul Fudge Profile at British Athletics fall of fame

1952 births
Living people
British female long-distance runners
British female marathon runners
English female long-distance runners
English female marathon runners
Commonwealth Games gold medallists for England
Commonwealth Games medallists in athletics
Athletes (track and field) at the 1978 Commonwealth Games
World Athletics Championships athletes for Great Britain
Medallists at the 1978 Commonwealth Games